The 2002 FIBA U16 European Championship Division C was held in Nicosia, Cyprus, from 2 to 6 July 2002. Six teams participated in the competition.

Participating teams

 (hosts)

Standings

2001–02 in European basketball
FIBA Europe Under-16 Championship
July 2002 sports events in Europe
FIBA U16 European Championship Division C